This is a list of notable events relating to the environment in 1983. They relate to environmental law, conservation, environmentalism and environmental issues.

Events
The Convention on the Conservation of Migratory Species of Wild Animals, also known as CMS or the Bonn Convention, enters into force. It aims to conserve terrestrial, marine and avian migratory species throughout their range.

January
 US president Ronald Reagan signed the Nuclear Waste Policy Act.

February
The U.S. Environmental Protection Agency bought the town of Times Beach, Missouri following the largest ever dioxin exposure in the country.

March
 The Alliance '90/The Greens political party won 27 seats in the West German federal election. It was the first Green Party to gain representation in state elections.
The Convention on Long-Range Transboundary Air Pollution entered into force.

May
The World Heritage Properties Conservation Act 1983 is passed in Australia.

July
The Commonwealth v Tasmania, a significant Australian court case was decided in the High Court of Australia. It was a landmark decision in Australian constitutional law, and was a significant moment in the history of conservation in Australia. The case centered on the proposed construction of a hydro-electric dam on the Gordon River in Tasmania, which was supported by the Tasmanian government, but opposed by the Australian federal government and environmentalist groups.

October
MARPOL 73/78 (International Convention for the Prevention of Pollution From Ships, 1973 as modified by the Protocol of 1978) entered into force.

See also

Egyptian Law 102 of 1983
Human impact on the environment
List of environmental issues